The Piéton is a northern tributary of the Sambre in the Belgian Province of Hainaut. Their confluence is in Charleroi.

References 

Rivers of Belgium
Rivers of Hainaut (province)